December 12 - Eastern Orthodox liturgical calendar - December 14

All fixed commemorations below celebrated on December 26 by Eastern Orthodox Churches on the Old Calendar.

For December 13th, Orthodox Churches on the Old Calendar commemorate the Saints listed on November 30.

Saints
 Martyrs Eustratius, Auxentius, Eugene, Mardarius, and Orestes, at Sebaste (284-305)
 Venerable Ares, monk in the Egyptian desert.
 Venerable Arsenius the Ascetic of Mt. Latros (c. 8th-10th century)

Pre-Schism Western saints
 Martyr Antiochus of Sulcis, under the Emperor Hadrian (c. 110)
 Virgin-martyr Lucy of Syracuse (Lucia) (304)
 Saint Columba of Terryglass and Holy Island on Lough Derg, Ireland (549)  (see also: December 12)
 Saint Judoc (Judocus, Judganoc, Josse), a priest, brother of King Judicäel of Brittany, became a hermit in Villiers-Saint-Josse (c. 668)
 Saint Aubert, Bishop of Cambrai-Arras in France, founded monasteries including Saint Vaast in Arras (669)
 Saint Odilia of Alsace (Otilia, Othilia) (c. 720)
 Saint Edburga of Minster-in-Thanet, a disciple of St Mildred, whom she probably succeeded as Abbess of Minster-in-Thanet in 716 (751)
 Saint Tassilo, Duke of Bavaria and a great monastic benefactor, became a monk at Jumièges Abbey, reposed at Lorsch Abbey (c. 794)
 Saints Einhildis and Roswinda, nuns at Hohenburg Abbey in Alsace in France with St Ottilia (8th century)
 Saint Wilfrid (Wiffred), a monk and Abbot of the Monastery of St Victor in Marseilles, France (1021)

Post-Schism Orthodox saints
 Venerable Arcadius of Novy Torg, Monk of Novotorzhok, disciple of St. Ephrem (1077)
 Saints Neophytos, Ignatius, Procopius and Neilos, founders of the Holy Monastery of Machaira, Cyprus (1145, 1172)
 Saint Mardarius, Recluse of the Kiev Caves (13th century)
  Hieromartyr Gabriel (Gabriel I of Pec), Serbian Patriarch (1659)
 Saint Dositheus, Metropolitan of Moldavia (Romania) (1693)
 Venerable Nicodemus of Romania.
 Venerable Herman of Alaska, Wonderworker of Alaska (1836).  (see also: August 9 - Glorification)

New martyrs and confessors
 New Hieromartyr Alexander Yuzefovich, Priest, and Martyr John Menkov (1920)
 New Hieromartyr Vladimir Lozina-Lozinsky, Protopresbyter of St. Petersburg (1937)
 New Hieromartyrs Alexander Pospelov and Jacob Gusev, Priests (1937)
 New Hieromartyr Nicholas Amasiysky, Priest of Alma-Ata (1938)
 New Hieromartyrs Emilian Kireyev and Basil Pokrov, Priests (1941)

Other commemorations
 Repose of Schemamonk Panteleimon “the Resurrected,” of Glinsk Hermitage (1895)
 Repose of Blessed Maximus of Ustiug (1906)
 Repose of Bishop Theodore, Wonderworker of Trolov Convent in Kiev (1924)
 Repose of Hieromonk Joel of Valaam (1937)
 Repose of Archimandrite Gerasim Iscu, of Tismana Monastery, Romania (1951)

Icon gallery

Notes

References

Sources
 December 13/26. Orthodox Calendar (PRAVOSLAVIE.RU).
 December 26 / December 13. HOLY TRINITY RUSSIAN ORTHODOX CHURCH (A parish of the Patriarchate of Moscow).
 December 13. OCA - The Lives of the Saints.
 The Autonomous Orthodox Metropolia of Western Europe and the Americas (ROCOR). St. Hilarion Calendar of Saints for the year of our Lord 2004. St. Hilarion Press (Austin, TX). p. 93.
 December 13. Latin Saints of the Orthodox Patriarchate of Rome.
 The Roman Martyrology. Transl. by the Archbishop of Baltimore. Last Edition, According to the Copy Printed at Rome in 1914. Revised Edition, with the Imprimatur of His Eminence Cardinal Gibbons. Baltimore: John Murphy Company, 1916.
Greek Sources
 Great Synaxaristes:  13 ΔΕΚΕΜΒΡΙΟΥ. ΜΕΓΑΣ ΣΥΝΑΞΑΡΙΣΤΗΣ.
  Συναξαριστής. 13 Δεκεμβρίου. ECCLESIA.GR. (H ΕΚΚΛΗΣΙΑ ΤΗΣ ΕΛΛΑΔΟΣ). 
Russian Sources
  26 декабря (13 декабря). Православная Энциклопедия под редакцией Патриарха Московского и всея Руси Кирилла (электронная версия). (Orthodox Encyclopedia - Pravenc.ru).
  13 декабря (ст.ст.) 26 декабря 2013 (нов. ст.). Русская Православная Церковь Отдел внешних церковных связей. (DECR).

December in the Eastern Orthodox calendar